From Out of Nowhere is the fourteenth studio album by British rock band Electric Light Orchestra (ELO), and the second credited to Jeff Lynne's ELO. The band's first studio album in four years, it was released on 1 November 2019 through Big Trilby and Columbia Records. The title track was released as the lead single on 26 September 2019. Lynne played most instruments on the album. Despite only playing on one track, keyboardist Richard Tandy finally returned to Jeff Lynne's ELO as a permanent member.

Background
Lynne stated that the first track he wrote for the album was the title track, and said it was named "From Out of Nowhere" as "that's exactly where it came from". Its themes of "hope and salvation" and optimism also appear throughout the album.

From Out of Nowhere Tour
In January 2020 Jeff Lynne's ELO announced a tour that would take place across the UK, Europe, and Ireland. On 15 May the tour was cancelled due to the COVID-19 pandemic.

Critical reception

The album received generally favourable reviews.

Track listing

Personnel
Adapted from Stereogum, the official press release, and the album liner notes.
 Jeff Lynne – vocals, guitars, bass guitar, piano, drums, keyboards, cello on "Losing You", vibraphone, mixing
 Richard Tandy – piano solo on "One More Time"
 Steve Jay – engineering, mixing, tambourine, shakers

Additional personnel
 Bob Ludwig – mastering
 Ryan Corey – art direction, design, illustration
 Joseph Cultice – photography

Charts and certifications

Weekly charts

Year-end charts

Certifications

References

2019 albums
Electric Light Orchestra albums
Albums produced by Jeff Lynne
Columbia Records albums